Overseas Chinese Town (OCT) is the colloquial name for a cluster of scenic spots in Nanshan District of Shenzhen, Guangdong Province, China, around the Window of the World Station, Overseas Chinese Town Station, Qiaocheng East Station and Qiaocheng North Station of the Luobao Line (Line 1) and Shekou Line (Line 2) of Shenzhen Metro. In the future, Meilin Line (Line 9) will also pass this area and serve OCT Harbour (OCT Bay) and the University of Hong Kong-Shenzhen Hospital.  It is classified as an AAAAA scenic area by the China National Tourism Administration.

Main sights

The area features a number of theme parks, they include Splendid China, Chinese Folk Culture Village, Window of the World, and Happy Valley Shenzhen. It is currently owned and operated by Overseas Chinese Town Enterprises and its subsidiaries. OCT Tower is situated here.

OCT Contemporary Art Terminal is in the community.

Extensions have been made in different locations within Shenzhen. These include Overseas Chinese Town East in Yantian and Overseas Chinese Town Bay.

Education

Schools for local students:
 OCT Elementary School (华侨城小学)
 OCT High School (深圳市华侨城中学) OCT Branch(侨城部)

In addition, the Shenzhen Korean Chamber of Commerce and Industry organizes a Korean Saturday school because many Korean students are not studying in Korean-medium schools; the school had about 600 students in 2007. The chamber uses rented space in the OCT Primary School as the Korean weekend school's classroom.

See also 
Huaxia Art Centre

References

External links
Overseas Chinese Town Holding Company
Huaqiaocheng Station with exits in English/Chinese/Pinyin
OCT BAY Mangrove Groove 3D Watershow

Nanshan District, Shenzhen
AAAAA-rated tourist attractions